Hanne Maudens (born 12 March 1997) is a Belgian heptathlete. She competed in the women's heptathlon at the 2017 World Championships in Athletics. In 2020, she won the gold medal in the women's long jump event at the 2020 Belgian Indoor Athletics Championships held in Ghent, Belgium.

References

External links
 

1997 births
Living people
Belgian heptathletes
World Athletics Championships athletes for Belgium
People from Wetteren
Athletes (track and field) at the 2014 Summer Youth Olympics
Belgian Athletics Championships winners
Sportspeople from East Flanders